Cyperus tenax is a species of sedge that is endemic to parts of eastern and southern Africa.

The species was first formally described by the botanist Johann Otto Boeckeler in 1868.

See also 
 List of Cyperus species

References 

tenax
Taxa named by Johann Otto Boeckeler
Plants described in 1868
Flora of Zimbabwe
Flora of Zambia
Flora of the Democratic Republic of the Congo
Flora of Uganda
Flora of Tanzania
Flora of Angola
Flora of Benin
Flora of the Republic of the Congo
Flora of South Africa
Flora of Equatorial Guinea
Flora of Gabon
Flora of Ivory Coast
Flora of Kenya
Flora of Malawi
Flora of Liberia
Flora of Mozambique
Flora of Namibia
Flora of Nigeria
Flora of Sierra Leone